Bullia mirepicta is a species of sea snail, a marine gastropod mollusc in the family Nassariidae, the Nassa mud snails or dog whelks.

Description

Distribution
This marine species occurs off Madagascar.

References

 Bozzetti, L., 2007. Bullia mirepicta (Gastropoda: Hypsogastropoda) nuova specie dal Madagascar meridionale. Malacologia Mostra Mondiale 57: 14-15

Nassariidae
Gastropods described in 2007